This is a list of comics or comic strips that have been made into feature films. The title of the work is followed by the work's author, the title of the film, and the year of the film. If a film has an alternate title based on geographical distribution, the title listed will be that of the widest distribution area.

Where noted with "char" or "concept", the characters or concepts from a work have been used, but the script may have been original and not based on a specific work.

0-9
30 Days of Night, Steve Niles - 30 Days of Night, 2007
300, Frank Miller - 300, 2007

A-Z
Ace Drummond, Eddie Rickenbacker - Ace Drummond, 1936
The Adventures of Smilin' Jack, Zack Mosley - The Adventures of Smilin' Jack, 1943
Art School Confidential,  Daniel Clowes - Art School Confidential, 2006
Asterix and Cleopatra, René Goscinny and Albert Uderzo - Asterix & Obelix: Mission Cleopatra, 2002
Asterix and Cleopatra, René Goscinny and Albert Uderzo - Asterix and Cleopatra, 1968
Asterix and the Great Crossing, René Goscinny and Albert Uderzo - Asterix Conquers America, 1994
Asterix and the Normans, René Goscinny and Albert Uderzo - Asterix and the Vikings, 2006
Asterix and the Soothsayer, René Goscinny and Albert Uderzo - Asterix and the Big Fight, 1989
Asterix at the Olympic Games, René Goscinny and Albert Uderzo - Astérix aux Jeux Olympiques, 2008
Asterix in Britain, René Goscinny and Albert Uderzo - Asterix in Britain, 1986
Asterix the Gaul, René Goscinny and Albert Uderzo - Asterix the Gaul, 1967
Asterix the Legionary and Asterix the Gladiator, René Goscinny and Albert Uderzo - Asterix Versus Caesar, 1985
Batman, Bob Kane and Bill Finger - Batman Begins (char)
Blade, Marv Wolfman and Gene Colan - Blade II (char), 2002
Boban and Molly, Toms - Bobanum Moliyum (char), (1971)
Bokkō, Ken'ichi Sakemi - A Battle of Wits, 2006	
Casper the Friendly Ghost, Seymour Reit and Joe Oriolo - Casper (char), 1995	
Daredevil, Frank Miller - Elektra (char), 2005
Fantastic Four, Stan Lee and Jack Kirby - The Fantastic Four, 1994; Fantastic Four, 2005; Fantastic Four: Rise of the Silver Surfer, 2007	
Flash Gordon, Alex Raymond - Flash Gordon, 1980		
Hellblazer, Alan Moore - Constantine, 2005	
Hulk, Stan Lee and Jack Kirby	
Justice League, Gardner Fox - Justice League: Worlds Collide		
The League of Extraordinary Gentlemen, Alan Moore - The League of Extraordinary Gentlemen, 		
Mirko i Slavko, Desimir Žižović Buin - Mirko i Slavko, 1973 		
Monica's Gang, Mauricio de Sousa
Mortadelo y Filemón, 	Francisco Ibáñez - La gran aventura de Mortadelo y Filemón, 2003	
Motu Patlu, Kripa Shankar Bhardwaj - Motu Patlu: King of Kings (char), (2016)
"My Mania: 13th Quiz Show" (comic book episode), Eakasit Thairaat - 13 Beloved, 2006	
The Punisher War Zone, John Romita, Jr. - Punisher: War Zone, 2008	
Sin City, Frank Miller - Sin City, 2005	
The Sons of Rama, Anant Pai and Ram Waeerkar - Sons of Ram, 2012
Superman, Jerry Siegel and Joe Shuster - Atom Man vs. Superman,	1950	
Tales from the Crypt, William Gaines and Al Feldstein - Tales from the Crypt, 1972		
Teenage Mutant Ninja Turtles, Kevin Eastman and Peter Laird - Teenage Mutant Ninja Turtles, 1990; Teenage Mutant Ninja Turtles II: The Secret of the Ooze, Teenage Mutant Ninja Turtles III, TMNT		
The Adventures of Tintin, Hergé - Tintin and the Temple of the Sun, 1969		
V for Vendetta, Alan Moore - V for Vendetta, 2005	
Watchmen, Alan Moore - Watchmen, 2009

See also
List of films based on comics
List of films based on manga

 

Films
Films